Rucentra smetanai is a species of beetle in the family Cerambycidae. It was described by Hüdepohl in 1992. It is known from Borneo.

References

Apomecynini
Beetles described in 1992